This is a list of films produced in Puerto Rico.

1953-1969

1970s

1980s

1990s

2000s

2010s

References

External links
 Puerto Rican film at the Internet Movie Database

Puerto Rican

Films